Les Braves de Valleyfield or the Valleyfield Braves are a Canadian junior ice hockey team in the Quebec Junior Hockey League (LHJQ). They play in Salaberry-de-Valleyfield, Quebec at the Aréna Salaberry.

History
As part of the College St. Lawrence, the team went by the name "St. Lawrence College of Québec Lions" during its first three seasons. After a modest first season, the Lions reached the playoffs in their second season. The 2005–06 season saw them reach the quarterfinals in the playoffs and achieve a winning regular season record.

In 2007, the team was renamed the Quebec AssurExperts.

In 2008, the team was purchased and moved to Thetford Mines and rebranded as the Thetford Mines Filons.

In 2010, the franchise was moved to La Tuque, Quebec and the team rebranded as the Loups de La Tuque (La Tuque Wolves).

Eleven games into the LNAH season, the original Valleyfield Braves franchise moved to Laval, Quebec and became the Laval Braves.

Season-by-season record
Note: GP = Games Played, W = Wins, L = Losses, T = Ties, OTL = Overtime Losses, GF = Goals for, GA = Goals against

References

External links
  
  at Elite Prospects

Ligue de Hockey Junior AAA Quebec teams
Salaberry-de-Valleyfield